Mecyclothorax cordicollis is a species of ground beetle in the subfamily Psydrinae. It was first described by Thomas Gibson Sloane in 1900, as Cyclothorax cordicollis. It is found in Queensland, New South Wales and Victoria.

References

cordicollis
Beetles described in 1900